All the Way is the second and final studio album by American pop rock band  Allstar Weekend. It was released on September 27, 2011 via Hollywood Records. It was also their final album to feature guitarist Nathan Darmody, who left 
the band 10 days before it was released.

The album is preceded by the lead single, "Not Your Birthday", released on March 22, 2011. The album's second single, "Blame It on September" was released on August 16, 2011.

There has been some controversy surrounding the song "Not Your Birthday", because that song had profanity parents considered inappropriate for young listeners, especially for a group endorsed by Disney Channel. Despite this, the album was released without a Parental Advisory sticker. Also, because Radio Disney had released a clean version of the single, that replaces the explicit lyrics and lyrics that mention drinking, especially during Anth's rap.

The album debuted at #49 on the Top Billboard 200 Chart in the US, and #71 in Canada.

Singles
The album's first single, "Not Your Birthday", was released on March 22, 2011. The music video premiered on VEVO on March 4, 2011 prior to the actual song being released. It was featured in the movie Prom.

The album's second single, "Blame It on September", was released on August 16, 2011. They shot the music video in Toronto, Ontario and it premiered on VEVO on September 23, 2011.

Track listing
Below is the track listing for the album.

Charts

References

External links
 Allstar Weekend - official website
 Allstar Weekend - MySpace
 Allstar Weekend - Facebook
 Allstar Weekend - Twitter
 Allstar Weekend - YouTube
 Getting to Know Allstar Weekend
 Allstar Weekend on UStream
 Breaking Allstar Weekend News! Plus, Week 11 of their Tour Diary!

2011 albums
Hollywood Records albums
Allstar Weekend albums
Albums produced by J. R. Rotem